Alberto Bienvenú (23 October 1916 – 24 January 2004) was a Mexican basketball player. He competed in the men's tournament at the 1948 Summer Olympics.

References

External links
 

1916 births
2004 deaths
Mexican men's basketball players
Olympic basketball players of Mexico
Basketball players at the 1948 Summer Olympics
Basketball players from Mexico City